Zinc finger AN1-type containing 5 is a protein that in humans is encoded by the ZFAND5 gene.

References

Further reading